Gerben Jorritsma (born 21 August 1993) is a Dutch former speed skater who specialized in the sprint distances.

Career 
He won the 1,500 meters 2015–16 ISU Speed Skating World Cup event in Calgary on 15 November 2015 in a personal record of 1:07,20, ahead of Russia's Pavel Kulizhnikov. Jorritsma was a member of the Team LottoNL-Jumbo and later TalentNED. In the 2020-21 season he didn't have a sponsor and he had to quit with speed skating. His cousin Jorjan Jorritsma was also a speed skater.

Personal records

Tournament overview

 DNS = Did not start
 DNF = Did not finish
 NC = No classification
source:

References

External links
 Team LottoNL-Jumbo profile

1993 births
Living people
Dutch male speed skaters
Sportspeople from Drenthe